The following teams and players took part in the women's volleyball tournament at the 1976 Summer Olympics, in Montreal.

Rosters

Carole Bishop
 Barbara Dalton
 Kathy Girvan
 Patty Olson
 Regyna Armonas
 Anne Ireland
 Mary Dempster
 Claire Lloyd
 Betty Baxter
 Connie Lebrun
 Debbie Heeps
 Audrey Vandervelden
Head coach
 Moo Park

Mercedes Pérez
 Imilsis Télles
 Ana Díaz
 Mercedes Pomares
 Lucila Urgelles
 Mercedes Roca
 Miriam Herrera
 Claudina Villaurrutia
 Melania Tartabull
 Nelly Barnet
 Ana María García
 Evelina Borroto
Head coach
 Eugenio George

Karla Roffeis
 Johanna Strotzer
 Cornelia Rickert
 Christine Mummhardt
 Ingrid Mierzwiak
 Helga Offen
 Barbara Czekalla
 Jutta Balster
 Anke Westendorf
 Hannelore Meincke
 Monika Meißner
 Gudrun Gärtner
Head coach
 Dieter Grund

Zsuzsa Szloboda
 Gyöngyi Bardi-Gerevich
 Éva Biszku
 Zsuzsa Biszku
 Lucia Bánhegyi-Radó
 Gabriella Csapó-Fekete
 Ágnes Gajdos-Hubai
 Judit Schlégl-Blaumann
 Ágnes Torma
 Katalin Eichler-Schadek
 Emerencia Siry-Király
 Éva Sebők-Szalay
Head coach
 Gabriella Kotsis

Takako Iida
 Mariko Okamoto
 Echiko Maeda
 Noriko Matsuda
 Takako Shirai
 Kiyomi Kato
 Yuko Arakida
 Katsuko Kanesaka
 Mariko Yoshida
 Shoko Takayanagi
 Hiromi Yano
 Juri Yokoyama
Head coach
 Shigeo Yamada

Mercedes Gonzáles
 Maria Cárdeñas
 Teresa Núñez
 Irma Cordero
 Ana Cecilia Carrillo
 Luisa Merea
 Delia Córdova
 Silvia Quevedo
 Luisa Fuentes
 María del Risco
 María Cervera
 María Ostolaza
Head coach
 Man Bok-Park

Lee Soon-bok
 Yu Jung-hye
 Byon Kyung-ja
 Lee Soon-ok
 Baik Myung-sun
 Chang Hee-sook
 Ma Kum-ja
 Yoon Young-nae
 Yu Kyung-hwa
 Park Mi-kum
 Jung Soon-ok
 Jo Hea-jung
Head coach
 Kim Han-soo

Anna Rostova
 Lyudmila Shchetinina
 Liliya Osadchaya
 Natalia Kushnir
 Olga Kozakova
 Nina Smoleyeva
 Lyubov Rudovskaya
 Larisa Bergen
 Inna Ryskal
 Lyudmila Chernyshyova
 Zoya Yusova
 Nina Muradyan
Head coach
 Givi Akhvlediani

References

1976